The 2011 NWT/Yukon Scotties Tournament of Hearts was held January 27–30 at the Whitehorse Curling Club in Whitehorse, Yukon. The winning team of Kerry Galusha represented Yukon/NWT at the 2011 Scotties Tournament of Hearts in Charlottetown, Prince Edward Island, where they finished round robin play with a record of 3–8.

Teams

Standings

Results

Draw 1
January 27, 2:00 PM

Draw 2
January 28, 9:30 AM

Draw 3
January 28, 2:30 PM

Draw 4
January 29, 1:00 PM

Draw 5
January 29, 6:00 PM

Draw 6
January 30, 10:00 AM

References

Yukon nwt Scotties Tournament Of Hearts, 2011
Yukon NWT
NWT Yukon Scotties Tournament Of Hearts
Curling in Yukon